Crossing the Border is the second album released by Rawlins Cross. It was released in 1992, under the Ground Swell label.

Track listing
All songs are written by Dave Panting, unless otherwise noted.

Legendary  – 3:45
Chessboard Dancer  – 3:52
Nightfall (Geoff Panting) – 3:45
Israel Got a Rabbit (Traditional) – 2:01
Eleventh Hour (G. Panting) – 3:28
Stray Cat  – 2:51
Blues for You  – 4:19
O'Neil's March/Haughts of Cromdale (Traditional) – 3:13
Peace on the Inside (G. Panting) – 3:11
Memory Waltz  – 3:49
Sound of Sleat/Ale is Dear (first reel D. MacKinnon/second Traditional) – 3:08
Open Road  – 3:16

Personnel

Rawlins Cross

Dave Panting - guitar, mandolin, lead vocals, backing vocals
Ian McKinnon - highland bagpipe, trumpet, tin whistle, bodhran, backing vocals
Geoff Panting - keyboards, piano, button accordion, lead vocals, backing vocals
Brian Bourne - bass, chapman stick, backing vocals
Tom Roach - drums, percussion
Derek Pelley - backing vocals, acoustic guitar on "Open Road"

Production

Howard England - producer, mixing engineer
Derek Caines - cover art
Deryk Wenaus - design and layout

1992 albums
Rawlins Cross albums